Uppinbetageri  is a village in the southern state of Karnataka, India. It is located in the Dharwad taluk of Dharwad district in Karnataka.

Demographics
As of the 2011 Census of India there were 1,453 households in Uppinbetageri and a total population of 7,931 consisting of 4,074 males and 3,857 females. There were 1,007 children ages 0-6.

See also
 Dharwad
 Districts of Karnataka

References

External links
 www.koppal.nic.in/

Villages in Koppal district